The 2021–22 season was Stoke City's 105th season in the Football League, the 45th in the second tier and eighth in the Championship.

Stoke had a busy summer transfer window with the permanent departure of 13 players, which enabled O'Neill to make several new additions to his squad. A new look squad began the season well, gaining 35 points from the first 23 matches and they were just outside the play-off places at the turn of the year. However a poor run of results from January saw Stoke drop down the league and finish in a mid-table position for a fourth consecutive season.

Pre-season
Stoke announced their retained list on 1 June 2021 with Jordan Cousins the only senior player leaving whilst James Chester and John Obi Mikel signed one-year contract extensions. The club also posted a £87 million loss during the COVID-19 hit 2019–20 season with the losses blamed on the pandemic and "writing down" the value of the squad. Stoke were able to move on a number of players in the summer transfer window including, Benik Afobe, Moritz Bauer, Jordan Cousins, Peter Etebo, Lee Gregory, Mikel John Obi, Liam Lindsay, Bruno Martins Indi, Badou Ndiaye, Lasse Sørensen, Sam Vokes, Kevin Wimmer and Ryan Woods whilst Nathan Collins moved to Burnley for an estimated £12 million. Coming into the squad were goalkeeper Jack Bonham, striker Sam Surridge, midfielder Mario Vrančić and defender Ben Wilmot.

The Stoke squad returned to Clayton Wood for pre-season on 28 June 2021. They played a behind closed doors game against Scottish side Hibernian which ended in a 1–1 draw. Michael O'Neill then took a selected group of players for a week long training camp in Belfast. Stoke ended their week in Belfast with a 6–0 win over Linfield. On their return to England, Stoke beat Crewe Alexandra 3–2 at Gresty Road. Stoke then beat Aston Villa 2–0, lost 2–1 at Wigan Athletic before ending their pre-season schedule with a 1–1 draw against Wolverhampton Wanderers.

Championship

August
Stoke began the season at home to Reading with supporters allowed back into stadiums for the first time since March 2020. Nick Powell scored the opening goal in the 25th minute but Reading equalised immediately through John Swift. Jacob Brown then nutmegged Rafael Cabral to restore Stoke's lead. Liam Moore brought the Royals back level before new signing Sam Surridge scored on his debut to earn Stoke a 3–2 victory and their first opening day win since 2009. The first away match of the season saw Stoke and Birmingham City cancel each other out in a goalless draw. They then put in an impressive performance away at last seasons beaten play-off finalists Swansea City, winning 3–1 with goals from Powell, Clucas and Østigård whilst Joël Piroe scored a late consolation for the Swans. Stoke continued their good start to the season with a 1–0 win against Nottingham Forest, Josh Tymon scoring his first goal for the club. City suffered their first defeat of the campaign on 28 August going down 3–0 at promotion favourites Fulham. On transfer deadline day Stoke brought in right-back Demeaco Duhaney on a short-term contract and forward Abdallah Sima on loan from Brighton.

September
After the international break Stoke faced Huddersfield Town. After the Terriers had taken the lead through Harry Toffolo just after half-time Stoke responded with Brown heading in a corner and an own goal from Matty Pearson which earned Stoke a 2–1 win and their best start to a season for 17 years. Stoke played Barnsley four days later and drew 1–1 with a Cauley Woodrow free-kick cancelling out Surridge's opener. The match ended in unsavoury fashion as after Tommy Smith had been sent-off for a foul on Claudio Gomes, tempers boiled over and a scuffle between coaching staff and players resulted in two Stoke staff and one Barnsley staff being dismissed. Stoke were then beaten 2–1 by Derby County who had announced their intention to enter administration the day before. Stoke bounced back with a 2–0 win against Hull City with Vrančić scoring his first goal for the club and Powell scoring a long range free-kick. Stoke missed several chances away at Preston North End with a Benjamin Whiteman free-kick cancelling out Powell's early header.

October
In the Midlands derby against West Bromwich Albion Stoke produced a dominant performance but were again guilty of poor finishing including a missed penalty from Surridge but with ten minutes remaining Powell lobbed Baggies keeper Sam Johnstone to earn Stoke a 1–0 victory. After the international break Stoke lost 2–1 at Sheffield United and 1–0 to league leaders AFC Bournemouth. They then lost a third match in a row, 2–1 away at Millwall despite Romaine Sawyers giving them a 20th minute lead. Stoke ended a unproductive October by blowing a three goal lead at home to Cardiff City in a 3–3 draw.

November
Stoke responded by winning back-to back away games 1–0 against Blackpool and Luton Town. During the international break Stoke announced that Chief Executive Tony Scholes will be leaving to club in January after 17 years in the role. Stoke suffered a major injury blow as Harry Souttar was ruled out for the remainder of the season after suffering a cruciate knee ligament injury playing for Australia. After the break Stoke beat newly promoted Peterborough United 2–0 with goals from Vrancic and Tyrese Campbell. Four days later poor finishing cost them as they fell to a 1–0 defeat at Bristol City. Stoke dropped out of the play-off places at the end of November at the expense of Blackburn Rovers who beat them 1–0, Reda Khadra scoring the only goal.

December
Stoke beat Queens Park Rangers 2–0 on 5 December in what was their first win in London since October 2014. City then played out a drab goalless draw against Middlesbrough. Stoke's matches against Coventry City and Barnsley was postponed following a COVID-19 outbreak at the club. They ended 2021 with a poor 2–1 defeat against Derby County.

January
Stoke began a busy January with a second consecutive 2–1 home defeat this time against Preston North End where goals from Brad Potts and Andrew Hughes cancelled out a 35-yard strike from Ben Wilmot. City beat Hull City 2–0 with goals from goals from Brown and Ince. A week later Stoke faced league leaders Fulham at home. They made a great start with D'Margio Wright-Phillips scoring his first league goal in the opening minute but Rodrigo Muniz levelled straight from the restart. Muniz scored again to put Fulham in front before half time before Lewis Baker equalised from long range. Fulham went on to win the game 3–2 through Bobby Decordova-Reid. Stoke lost 1–0 at Coventry on 25 January as poor defending gifted Viktor Gyökeres the only goal. They ended January with a 1–1 draw at Huddersfield Town.

Stoke were very active the January transfer window with Danny Batth, Adam Davies and Sam Surridge leaving the club permanently whilst Alfie Doughty and Tom Ince left on loan. Coming into the team were Lewis Baker, Taylor Harwood-Bellis, Phil Jagielka, Josh Maja, Liam Moore and Jaden Philogene-Bidace.

February
Stoke dominated the next match against Swansea City with goals from Philogene-Bidace, Baker and Brown earning the side a comfortable 3–0 victory. Stoke then played out an entertaining 2–2 draw against Nottingham Forest. Brennan Johnson gave Forest the lead before Maja scored his first league goal for the club. Brice Samba was then sent-off after conceding a penalty which was converted by Baker but Ryan Yates scored in stoppage time to deny Stoke the win. Stoke then drew 2–2 with Birmingham City and lost 2–1 to Luton and Bournemouth as they ended February in 15th position.

March
Stoke's poor form continued into March with a third straight league defeat, 1–0 against Blackpool prompting an angry reaction from supporters. The team then played away at the leagues bottom two clubs, Barnsley and Peterborough United and drew both matches and were also beaten by Cardiff City. Stoke ended their nine match winless run with a 2–0 win over Millwall on 19 March. During the international break it was announced by joint chairman John Coates that the clubs owners, bet365 Group, have converted £40m of loans into equity in the club's holding company, and waived £120m of shareholder loans.

April
An own goal from Sheffield United centre-back John Egan gave the Potters a second consecutive home victory. They then lost 2–1 at relegation-threatened Reading. Stoke then beat Midlands rivals West Bromwich Albion 3–1, with goals from Baker, Brown and an own goal from Jake Livermore. On Good Friday Stoke played Bristol City in a match of poor quality a late cross-cum-shot from Jay Dasilva looped over Jack Bonham to earn the Robins the win. On Easter Monday Stoke beat Blackburn Rovers 1–0 at Ewood Park with an early goal from Jacob Brown. They this followed up against Queens Park Rangers with another 1–0 win, Brown again scoring the only goal. The last away match of the season saw City beaten by play-off chasing Middlesbrough.

May
For the final match of the 2021–22 season against Coventry City, O'Neill gave a debut to academy prospect Tom Sparrow. Coventry took the lead in the 14th minute through Viktor Gyökeres before Sam Clucas earned Stoke a point just before half time. Stoke ended another disappointing season in 14th position, a fourth consecutive bottom half finish.

Results

League table

FA Cup

Stoke were drawn at home to EFL League Two side Leyton Orient in the third round of the FA Cup and won 2–0 with goals from Tom Ince and Tyrese Campbell. League One side Wigan Athletic were the opponents in the fourth round and Stoke again won 2–0 with goals from debutant Josh Maja and Jacob Brown. Stoke were knocked out in the fifth round 2–1, away at Crystal Palace.

EFL Cup

Stoke were drawn at home to Fleetwood Town in the first round, and won the match 2–1 with goals from Sam Surridge and Harry Souttar. In the second round against Doncaster Rovers goals from Tom Ince and Sam Surridge helped the team to a 2–0 victory. Stoke overcame Premier League side Watford 3–1 in the third round with goals from Powell, Clucas and Tymon. In the fourth round, City were knocked out 2–1 by Brentford.

Squad statistics

Transfers

In

Out

Loans in

Loans out

References

Stoke City F.C.
Stoke City F.C. seasons